Darkush (also spelled Darkoush or Derkush) is a town in northern Syria, administratively part of the Idlib Governorate, located northwest of Idlib along the Syrian–Turkish borders on the Orontes River. Nearby localities include al-Janudiyah, Zarzur and al-Najiyah to the southwest, Jisr al-Shughur to the south and Millis and Maarrat Misrin to the east. According to the Syria Central Bureau of Statistics, Darkush had a population of 5,295 in the 2004 census. The town is also the administrative center of the Darkush nahiyah which consists of 19 villages with a combined population of 23,022. Its inhabitants are predominantly Sunni Muslims.

History
An inscription at the town, dating back to Roman times, attests to the existence of a shipwright in the town, building river-going boats to use on the Orontes. The town also has the remains of an ancient bridge. The Christianization of the city probably happened after 322.

During the Crusades, the town was the property of the Principality of Antioch until it was captured by Saladin in 1188. The town fell back to the Crusaders under Bohemond VI of Antioch and Tripoli in 1260. The city was finally re-captured by the Mamluk Sultan Baibars in 1267. Nothing remains of the town's Crusader citadel, as it was quarried for building stones. Darkush was visited by Syrian geographer Yaqut al-Hamawi in the 1220s, during Ayyubid rule. He noted that it was a "fortress near Antâkiyyah, in the 'Awâsim Province."

On 13 August 1822 the town and its surrounding areas were devastated by a massive earthquake. The earthquake is said to have killed 20,000 people all together.

Modern era
In the early 1960s it was described a large village of 2,500 residents and "one of the most picturesque" places in the area by geographer and author Robert Boulanger.

During the ongoing Syrian civil war which started in March 2011, Darkush was captured by anti-government forces in November 2012. Until then, the town was roughly divided politically with the residents in the northern part supporting the opposition while the south largely supported the government. Damaged buildings formerly belonging to the security forces marked the dividing line between the two sections. By late January 2013, the town was firmly in rebel hands and is used as a launching point for military operations against government-held positions in the mountains to the south.

Geography
The town of Darkush lies in a wadi in the Orontes River basin, at the foothills of the an-Nusayriyah Mountains.

References

Bibliography

 

Populated places in Jisr al-Shughur District
Towns in Syria